Eusebio da San Giorgio or Eusebio di Jacopo di Cristoforo da San Giorgio (c. 1470 – c. 1550) was an Italian painter of the Renaissance period.

Biography
Born in Perugia, he was a pupil of the painter Pietro Perugino. In 1494, he was elected as Camerlengo dell'Arte dei pittori.<ref>Bulletin of Art of Umbrian painters, Documenti Inediti sui Pittore Perugini, by Umberto Gnolli, page 124.</ref>

He painted an altarpiece for the parish church of Matelica (1512). He painted an Adoration of the Kings in the church of Sant’Agostino in Perugia. He painted frescoes of an Annunciation and a St Francis receiving the stigmata'' (1507) for the cloister of San Damiano at Assisi. In 1537, records note that along with Sinibaldo Ibi, he praised a work by Giovanni Battista Caporali completed for the main altar of the Duomo of Perugia.

References

External links

Works attributed to Eusebio da San Giorgio

1470s births
1550s deaths
People from Perugia
Umbrian painters
15th-century Italian painters
Italian male painters
16th-century Italian painters
Italian Renaissance painters
Fresco painters